Haseltine is an unincorporated community in Greene County, in the U.S. state of Missouri. The community location was west of Springfield on U.S. Route 266, adjacent to Interstate 44.

History
Variant names were "Dorchester" and "Hazeltine Station". A post office called Dorchester was established in 1881, and remained in operation until 1904. The community has the name of the local Hazeltine family.

References

Unincorporated communities in Greene County, Missouri
Unincorporated communities in Missouri